St Thomas' Church is in Church Lane, Lydiate, Sefton, Merseyside, England.  It is an active Anglican parish church in the deanery of Ormskirk, the archdeaconry of Warrington, and the diocese of Liverpool.  Its benefice has been combined with that of St Cuthbert, Halsall.  The church is recorded in the National Heritage List for England as a designated Grade II listed building.

History

The church was built between 1839 and 1841, and designed probably by A. H. Holme (the builders being S. Holme and Son).  At this time it was a chapel of ease to St Cuthbert, Halsall, and it became a separate parish in its own right in 1871.  Additions were made to the church in 1912, including the chancel, a south chapel and a north vestry, by the Lancaster architects Austin and Paley.  These additions cost £6,000.

Architecture

St Thomas' is constructed in stone with a slate roof.  Its plan consists of a four-bay nave, a chancel with a south chapel and a north vestry, and a west tower.  The tower has pointed doorways on the west and south sides, a north lancet window, a clock face on the south side, and a plain parapet with corner pinnacles.  The windows in the nave are lancets.  The east window has three lights with Perpendicular tracery.  There are two-light windows elsewhere in the chancel and chapel, and three-light windows in the vestry.  Inside the church is a west gallery carried on two octagonal iron columns.  The nave has a flat ceiling and the chancel a waggon roof.  In the chancel is a recess for a sedilia, and an alabaster reredos.  In the south window of the chancel is stained glass from 1913.

See also

 Listed buildings in Lydiate
 List of ecclesiastical works by Austin and Paley (1895–1914)

References

Church of England church buildings in Merseyside
Grade II listed churches in Merseyside
Churches completed in 1912
19th-century Church of England church buildings
Gothic Revival church buildings in England
Gothic Revival architecture in Merseyside
Anglican Diocese of Liverpool
Austin and Paley buildings
Buildings and structures in the Metropolitan Borough of Sefton
1912 establishments in England